The Minister of Local Government and Ownership Steering (formerly Minister of Local Government and Public Reforms) is one of the Finnish Government's 19 ministerial portfolios. Administratively, the portfolio is located within the Ministry of Finance. The ministerial position is responsible for Finland's municipal and regional government operations, the public sector's ICT, the financial control of government assets, and the Ministry of Finance's statistical functions.

The incumbent Minister of Local Government and Ownership Steering for the Marin Cabinet is Tytti Tuppurainen of the Social Democratic Party.

See also 
 Ministry of Finance (Finland)
 Politics of Finland

References 

Lists of government ministers of Finland